The position of president of Abkhazia was created in 1994. Before the office of president was created the head of state position was known as the chairman of Parliament between 1992 and the creation of the 1994 constitution. Before the position of Chairman of Parliament, the highest office in Abkhazia was the chairman of the Supreme Soviet. The post would last from the declaration of sovereignty from the Georgian Soviet Socialist Republic on 25 August 1990 until the outright declaration of independence on 23 July 1992.

Oath of office
During Alexander Ankvab's presidency, Parliament decided to scrap from the Presidential oath the phrase:

During a meeting on 16 July 2014, following the Abkhazian Revolution, Parliament decided to restore this phrase. According to Vice Speaker Emma Gamisonia, the decision to remove the phrase had been taken because it was perceived as a curse, following the premature death of Abkhazia's first two presidents, Vladislav Ardzinba and Sergei Bagapsh. MP Daur Arshba claimed that the decision had been taken illegally, without the necessary quorum.

On 18 August, the People's Assembly of Abkhazia additionally adopted a bill authored by Said Kharazia, and first proposed by him during the meeting on 16 July, adding the invocation
 — Almighty God, give me strength to serve country and people!

Non-presidential heads of state

List of presidents of Abkhazia

Latest election

See also

Government of the Republic of Abkhazia
Prime Minister of Abkhazia
Minister for Foreign Affairs of Abkhazia

References

External links
President of the Republic of Abkhazia – Official site (English Version)

Politics of Abkhazia
 
Heads of state
1994 establishments in Abkhazia